Polevaya is a rural locality (a village) in Malyginskoye Rural Settlement, Kovrovsky District, Vladimir Oblast, Russia. The population was 12 as of 2010.

Geography 
Polevaya is located 20 km north of Kovrov (the district's administrative centre) by road. Panyukino is the nearest rural locality.

References 

Rural localities in Kovrovsky District